Skye Edwards (born Shirley Klaris Yonavieve Edwards; 27 May 1974), sometimes simply Skye, is a British singer-songwriter. Her career began in 1994 when she and the Godfrey brothers (Paul Godfrey, a DJ, and Ross Godfrey, a multi-instrumentalist) formed the band Morcheeba, which released five albums with Skye as lead vocalist. In 2003, the band split, after which Skye released two solo albums: Mind How You Go in 2006, and Keeping Secrets in 2009. In 2010, Edwards returned to Morcheeba, again as lead vocalist. In 2012, she released her third solo album, Back to Now, while in 2015 she released her fourth one, In A Low Light.

Edwards decided to shorten her name to Skye by taking the first letter of each of her names and putting them together. She is married to bass player Steve Gordon and they have four children. Edwards has sung on two charity collaborations: "Perfect Day" (1997, in aid of Children in Need) and Band Aid 20 (2004, in aid of famine relief in Sudan, Africa).

Early life
Edwards was born in London and grew up in the East End. Of Jamaican heritage, she was fostered by ethnic English parents from an early age. She described her growing up as 'I always say it was fish and chips, not rice and peas in our house'. Her first musical influences were the country and western records of her mother.

Solo music career

Mind How You Go album
Produced by Patrick Leonard, Edwards' first solo album, Mind How You Go, was released on 27 February 2006 in Europe. The first single, "Love Show", was a radio hit throughout Europe. The next single was "What's Wrong With Me". Music videos were released with both songs. She has said: "People ask what this record means to me, but that's an alien question because I've been living and breathing it. It's not a question of what it means to me. This record is me."

Keeping Secrets album
In October 2009, Edwards released her second album, Keeping Secrets independently via her own label, Skyewards Recordings. Produced by Alexis Smith and Emmy nominated Grace Jones collaborator Ivor Guest. A single, "I Believe", was released along with a music video and she completed a tour of several weeks around Europe.

Back to Now album
This album was released on 29 October 2012 and produced by Steve Fitzmaurice, Irish record producer of, among others, Depeche Mode and U2.

Cover songs 
In 2007, Edwards performed the Gorillaz song "Feel Good Inc." live on KCRW radio station, along with other tracks from her album, and also at some live shows. In 2008, Edwards collaborated with Marc Collin of the French group Nouvelle Vague who put together Hollywood, Mon Amour, an album of popular songs from films of the 1980s. Edwards sang several songs on this album, including Blondie's "Call Me" and Duran Duran's "A View to a Kill" from the James Bond film of the same name.

As a Christmas gift to her fans, Edwards recorded a version of "River" by Joni Mitchell which was uploaded to YouTube in November 2011. On the John Martyn tribute album Johnny Boy Would Love This....A Tribute to John Martyn, released also in 2011, Edwards sang the track "Solid Air" from Martyn's 1973 album Solid Air. 

In February 2013, Edwards performed "As Long as You Love Me" by Justin Bieber on KCRW, Morning Becomes Eclectic. She also sang on Uncovered: QOTSA, by Olivier Libaux of the French band Nouvelle Vague; it is an album of Queens of the Stone Age songs covered by female singers, which was released on June 10, 2013 digitally and on vinyl in limited edition.

In 2020, Edwards performed the Yazz song "The Only Way Is Up" for the compilation Goodnight Songs for Rebel Girls produced by Rebel Girls, which involved a lineup of 19 female singers including Ani DiFranco, Macy Gray, Alicia Keys, Carole King and Anastacia.

Discography
Mind How You Go (2006)
Keeping Secrets (2009)
Back to Now (2012)
In a Low Light (2015)

References

External links

1974 births
Living people
English women singer-songwriters
Singers from London
20th-century Black British women singers
21st-century Black British women singers
British trip hop musicians
Atlantic Records artists
English people of Jamaican descent